WBQP-CD (channel 12) is a low-power Class A television station in Pensacola, Florida, United States, affiliated with theGrio. It is owned by Vernon and Mary Lynn Watson, who were the first African Americans to own a broadcast television station in Pensacola. On cable, the station is available on Cox Communications channel 39.

History
The Federal Communications Commission (FCC) licensed Vernon Watson to broadcast on channel 12 in Pensacola, Florida, in June 1992. The FCC then assigned the translator-style callsign W12CN to the station. In 1994 and 1995, the station was struggling to be added the local cable system and to have their TV schedule listed in the local newspapers—typical among most low-powered TV stations. In March 1995, the station became the WB affiliate for Pensacola. In September 1995, the station's call sign was changed from W12CN to WBQP-LP; later that month, the station was added to the local cable system. The WB affiliation eventually moved to WFGX (channel 35, now a MyNetworkTV affiliate) the following year, and then to WBPG (channel 55, now WFNA) in 2001.

Subchannels
The station's digital signal is multiplexed:

References

External links
Official website

BQP-CD
Television channels and stations established in 1992
Low-power television stations in the United States
TheGrio affiliates
Retro TV affiliates
YTA TV affiliates
Classic Reruns TV affiliates